Colette Ritz, real name Benitte Colette (Paris, 8 May 1932 - Proisy, 9 September 2007) was a French pop singer of the 1960s.

References

French women pop singers
1932 births
2007 deaths
Place of birth missing
20th-century French women singers